Gassendi is a large lunar impact crater feature located at the northern edge of Mare Humorum. It was named after French astronomer Pierre Gassendi. The formation has been inundated by lava during the formation of the mare, so only the rim and the multiple central peaks remain above the surface. The outer rim is worn and eroded, although it retains a generally circular form. A smaller crater – Gassendi A – intrudes into the northern rim, and joins a rough uplift at the northwest part of the floor. The crater pair bear a curious resemblance to a diamond ring.

In the southern part of the crater floor is a semi-circular ridge-like formation that is concentric with the outer rim. It is in the southern part where the rim dips down to its lowest portion, and a gap appears at the most southern point. The rim varies in height from as little as 200 meters to as high as 2.5 kilometers above the surface. The floor has numerous hummocks and rough spots. There is also a system of rilles that criss-crosses the floor, named the Rimae Gassendi.

The fresh crater Gassendi A is adjacent to Gassendi to the north.  Due to its ray system, Gassendi A is mapped as part of the Copernican System.On some older maps the crater Gassendi A was called Clarkson, after the British amateur astronomer and selenographer Roland L. T. Clarkson, but this name is not officially recognized by the IAU and the name has been removed.

Gassendi was considered for a possible landing site during the Apollo program, but was never selected.  However, it was imaged at high resolution by Lunar Orbiter 5, for this reason.  It was also heavily photographed by Apollo 16.

Satellite craters
By convention these features are identified on lunar maps by placing the letter on the side of the crater midpoint that is closest to Gassendi.

References

External links

 Gassendi's Fractures, LROC
 

 
 
 Lunar Orbiter 5 image (177) of southern Gassendi crater
 Lunar Orbiter 5 image (178) of central Gassendi crater
 Lunar Orbiter 5 image (179) of northern Gassendi crater and Gassendi A

Impact craters on the Moon